Ashida (written: 芦田) is a Japanese surname. People with the name include:

Ashida Nobumori, (died 1575), holder of Mitake Castle
, Japanese politician who served as the 47th Prime Minister of Japan
, Japanese fashion designer
, Japanese child actress, tarento and singer
, Japanese photographer
, Japanese actor
, Japanese fashion designer
, Japanese anime character designer, animation director and director

Fictional characters 

 Noriko Ashida (codename Surge), a character from X-Men

See also
Ashida-shuku, a historical rest area along the Nakasendō
Ashida River, a river near Fukuyama, Hiroshima, Japan

Japanese-language surnames